Ferdinand de Géramb (14 January 1772 – 15 March 1848) was an Austrian or French supposed aristocrat, military officer, courtier, adventurer and later Trappist monk and religious author. He served as lieutenant-general in the Austrian army, chamberlain to the Austrian Emperor and abbot and procurator-general of La Trappe.

Life

He was born at Lyon, but was said to come of a noble and ancient family in Hungary; some historians called in question both the place and date of his birth, and also his noble descent. He took an active part in the struggles of the monarchies in Europe against the French Revolution, and rose to the rank of lieutenant-general in Austria.

In 1808 he fell into the hands of Napoleon, who imprisoned him in the fortress of Vincennes until 1814, when the allied powers entered Paris. After bidding farewell to the Tsar and Emperor of Austria, he resolved to leave the world. It was at this time that he met the Rev. Father Eugene, Abbot of Notre Dame du Port du Salut, near Laval (France), of whom he begged to be admitted as a novice in the community. He pronounced his vows in 1817.

He was sent, in 1827, to the monastery of Mt. Olivet (Alsace). During the Revolution of 1830 de Géramb faced a troop of insurgents that had come to pillage the monastery; though the religious had been dispersed, the abbey was spared pillage. It was at this time that Brother Mary Joseph made his pilgrimage to Jerusalem.

On his return in 1833, he went to Rome, where he held the office of procurator-general of La Trappe. He soon gained the esteem of Pope Gregory XVI, who, though he was not a priest, named him titular abbot with the insignia of the ring and pectoral cross, a privilege without any precedent. Even under the monk's cowl the great nobleman could occasionally be seen distributing in alms considerable sums of money which he had received from his family to defray his expenses.  He died in Rome, aged 76.

Works

Abbot de Géramb was the author of many works, the principal of which are: "Letters to Eugene on the Eucharist"; "Eternity is approaching"; "Pilgrimage to Jerusalem"; "A Journey from La Trappe to Rome", besides many others of less importance and of an exclusively ascetical character. They were often reprinted and translated. His style is easy and without affectation. The customs, manners, and incidents of the journey which he describes, all are vividly given, and the topographical descriptions are accurate.

Family

In 1796, Baron de Géramb married his cousin Theresa de Adda, who died, in 1808, at Palermo. Six children had been born to him, of which number two died in their youth. On his entrance into La Trappe he confided the surviving children to the care of his brother, Léopold de Géramb, after having placed them under the protection of the Tsar and the Emperor of Austria.

References

1772 births
1848 deaths
French Christian monks